The Human Fly is a 1902 French short silent film by Georges Méliès. It was sold by Méliès's Star Film Company and is numbered 415–416 in its catalogues.

Méliès himself plays the Russian  dancer. This film is probably the first time Méliès used a vertical vantage point, pointing his camera directly toward the floor; two other technical effects, the substitution splice and the multiple exposure, completed the illusion.

References

External links
 

French black-and-white films
Films directed by Georges Méliès
French silent short films
1900s dance films
1900s French films